The Eternal Sapho (also known as A Modern Sapho and The Eternal Sappho) is a 1916 American silent drama film directed by Bertram Bracken and starring Theda Bara. The film was loosely based on the 1881 French novel Sapho, by Alphonse Daudet. The film is now considered lost.

The Eternal Sapho was produced by Fox Film Corporation and shot at the Fox Studio in Fort Lee, New Jersey. Some filming took place at the Marble House, a mansion located on a hill above 215th Street in New York.

Cast
 Theda Bara as Laura Bruffins
 James Cooley as Billy Malvin
 Walter Lewis as Mr. Marvin, Sr. 
 Hattie Delaro as Mrs. Marvin, Sr.
 Einar Linden as John Drummond
 Mary Martin as Mrs. Drummond
 Kittens Reichert as Drummond Child
 George MacQuarrie as Jack McCullough
 Warner Oland as H. Coudal
 Frank Norcross as Grubbins
 Caroline Harris as Mother Grubbins

See also
List of lost films
1937 Fox vault fire
List of Fox Film films

References

External links 

  

1916 films
1916 drama films
1916 lost films
Fox Film films
Silent American drama films
American silent feature films
American black-and-white films
Films based on French novels
Films based on works by Alphonse Daudet
Films shot in Fort Lee, New Jersey
Lost American films
Lost drama films
Films directed by Bertram Bracken
1910s American films